Eversholt Rail Group is a British rolling stock company (ROSCO). Together with Angel Trains and Porterbrook, it is one of the three original ROSCOs created as a result of the privatisation of British Rail.

Eversholt was established in March 1994 and was promptly privatised one year later via a £580 million management buyout. During February 1997, it was acquired by the Midland Bank and briefly renamed Forward Trust, and again renamed HSBC Rail. The company has primarily operated within the UK market, but between 2000 and 2009, HSBC Rail was also active on the European leasing market as well, before selling off this arm of the business to rival leasing firm Beacon Rail.

As HSBC Rail, it was involved in the supply of 28 British Rail Class 395 high speed train sets from Hitachi Europe in a £250million contract. The company also submitted an unsolicited response to the Intercity Express Programme, which was dismissed. In January 2010, HSBC Rail was rebranded back to the Eversholt Rail Group before being sold onto a consortium of private finance companies. It changed hands again during January 2015, being bought by a consortium of CK Hutchison Holdings and Cheung Kong Infrastructure Holdings. During the 2010s, the company focused on either selling or retrofitting aging elements of its rolling stock fleet.

History
Eversholt Rail Group was established on 21 March 1994 as a subsidiary of British Rail in preparation for the privatisation of British Rail. It was named after Eversholt Street in London near Euston station in which British Rail's offices were located. During November 1995, British Rail sold its subsidiary via a management buyout in exchange for £580 million; this price was subsequently criticised for being undervalued.

In February 1997, Eversholt was acquired by the Midland Bank at a reported cost of £726.5 million. At this time, its portfolio consisted of 4,000 electric locomotives and passenger multiple units. One year later, Eversholt was renamed Forward Trust. During November 1999, it was again renamed, this time to HSBC Rail, as part of a rebranding by parent company HSBC.

In 2000, HSBC Rail leased its first rolling stock outside of the United Kingdom via a financing arrangement on two EMD JT42CWRs for Swedish freight operator TGOJ Trafik. However, during 2009, the company ultimately opted to entirely withdraw from the European market; to this end, it sold its fleet of twenty EMD JT42CWR locomotives to Beacon Rail.

During June 2005, a contract valued at £250million was signed with Hitachi Europe to supply 28 British Rail Class 395 high speed train sets, with HSBC Rail acting as the financier. This contract was also the first ever British order for a Japanese train; Hitachi reportedly viewed the deal as a key opportunity to establish itself in the UK market. HSBC Rail also involved itself in a consortium providing maintenance services, referred to as 'DEPCO', to the fleet; other members were Fitzpatrick Contractors Ltd (construction), RPS Burks Green (architects/civil engineers), EMCOR UK (mechanical and electrical plant) and GrantRail (trackwork).

In January 2010, HSBC Rail was rebranded back to the Eversholt Rail Group. During November 2010, Eversholt was sold to a consortium of 3i, Morgan Stanley and Star Capital Partners.

During the early 2010s, in response to the Intercity Express Programme led by Britain's Department for Transport, Eversholt issued its own counter-proposal for the renewal of rolling stock on the East Coast Main Line. This option, which would have reportedly consisted of new locomotives and carriages, was to be considerably cheaper than the Class 800, a Hitachi-built high speed multiple unit train. However, Eversholt was ultimately unable to convince the DfT to pursue their solution.

In addition to the acquisition of new rolling stock, Eversholt has been a keen advocate of upgrading existing units as well. Its fleet of Class 321 electric multiple units has been subject to numerous extensive alterations and retrofits; in December 2013, it rebuilt one as a demonstrator for a proposed upgrade. In May 2018, plans were announced to convert some Class 321s with Alstom hydrogen cells, using the acronym HMU (hydrogen multiple unit) and re-designated Class 600. A number of this class of train will be converted to hydrogen power and operational by 2024. The first concept of this conversion, dubbed "Breeze", was revealed by Alstom and Eversholt Rail in January 2019. In March 2021, Eversholt announced the conversion of one for use as a parcels train.

In January 2015, Eversholt was purchased by a consortium of CK Hutchison Holdings and Cheung Kong Infrastructure Holdings in exchange for a reported £2 billion. At this time, it controlled roughly 28 percent of passenger trains within the UK market, thus the deal was subject to review by the European Commission. In March 2015, Eversholt announced the sale of its 920 wagon fleet to NACCO Industries.

While responsibility for the Class 365 EMUs was transferred to Eversholt during the privatisation process, due to the British Railways Board having leased rather than purchased these units, via a clause in the original procurement contract, ownership of the remaining 40 sets passed to the Department for Transport subsidiary Train Fleet (2019) Limited in July 2019, after it was obliged to pay out the leases to the Royal Bank of Scotland in the event that the trains were not wanted. In July 2021, all were sold back to Eversholt after the termination of their leases with Govia Thameslink Railway was agreed.

By May 2022, Eversholt Rail Group owned 3,246 vehicles, of which 2,721 are electric-powered.

Initial fleet
The fleet Eversholt Rail Group inherited from British Rail in 1994 comprised:

References

External links
 

CK Hutchison Holdings
Former HSBC subsidiaries
Post-privatisation British railway companies
Privatisation of British Rail
Railway companies established in 1994
Rolling stock leasing companies
3i Group companies
1994 establishments in England